Simone Vanni (born 16 February 16, 1979, in Pisa, Italy) is an Italian Olympic foil fencer. He won a team gold medal in Athens in the 2004 Olympics.

References

External links
 

1979 births
Living people
Italian male foil fencers
Fencers at the 2004 Summer Olympics
Olympic fencers of Italy
Olympic gold medalists for Italy
Olympic medalists in fencing
Medalists at the 2004 Summer Olympics
Sportspeople from Pisa
Fencers of Fiamme Oro